Purkot Daha is the administrative headquarter of Madane Rural Municipality which is in Lumbini province of Nepal. As of the 2001 Nepal Census, it had a population of 9,918, including 1,765 individual households.

References

External links
UN map of the municipalities of Gulmi District

Populated places in Gulmi District